Vystavochny Tsentr is a Moscow Monorail station in the Ostankinsky District, North-Eastern Administrative Okrug, Moscow, Russia. The station is near the main entrance of VDNKh, which was named the All-Russia Exhibition Center in 1992–2014, hence the station name.

History 
The station was opened on 20 November 2004 along with four stations of the monorail line (All but the southern terminus Timiryazevskaya which was opened nine days later). It began operation in "excursion mode". Only two trains were operating at the line, the interval between trains was as long as 30 minutes and station hours were from 10:00 to 16:00. The passengers could only board the trains at Ulitsa Sergeya Eisensteina station. On 10 January 2008 the line began regular operation serving passengers 6:50 - 23:00 and allowing them board trains at any station of the line. Also the ticket price was reduced from 50 to 19 rubles.

General information 
 The station opens at 06:50 and closes at 23:00.

References 

Moscow Monorail
Railway stations opened in 2004